The Maeotian Swamp or Maeotian Marshes (hē Maiōtis límnē, literally Maeotian Lake) was a name applied in antiquity variously to the swamps at the mouth of the Tanais River in Scythia (the modern Don in southern Russia) and to the entire Sea of Azov which it forms there. The people who lived around the sea were known as the Maeotians, although it remains unclear which was named for which.

The Ixomates were a tribe of the Maeotes. To the south of the Maeotes, east of the Crimea were the Sindes, their lands known as Scythia Sindica.

The marshes served to check the westward migration of nomad peoples from the steppe of Central Asia. The Iazyges, a Sarmatian tribe, were first heard of on the Maeotis, where they were among the allies of Mithridates II of Parthia. 

The untrustworthy 4th-century Historia Augusta claims the Roman emperor Marcus Claudius Tacitus secured a victory over the Alans near the marshes during his brief reign in 275 and 276.

References

Sea of Azov
Geography of Rostov Oblast
Scythia
Bosporan Kingdom